Arthur Reid Slipp (September 10, 1869 – February 6, 1958) was a Canadian politician. He served in the Legislative Assembly of New Brunswick as a member from Queens County.

References 

1869 births
1958 deaths